George A. Lovejoy (July 30, 1879 – March 2, 1944) was an American politician in the state of Washington. He served in the Washington State Senate from 1933 to 1943. From 1941 to 1943, he was President pro tempore of the Senate.

References

Democratic Party Washington (state) state senators
1879 births
1944 deaths
People from Central City, Nebraska